Tactusa nilssoni is a moth of the family Erebidae first described by Michael Fibiger in 2010. It is known from southern  Thailand.

The wingspan is 9–10 mm. The ground colour of the forewing is light yellow to brownish yellow, with an acutely angled blackish patch in the upper medial area and a black subterminal area. Only the subterminal and terminal lines are marked, the former inwardly outlined light yellow and the latter with black interneural spots. The hindwing is dark grey, with a discal spot and the underside is unicolorous grey.

References

Micronoctuini
Taxa named by Michael Fibiger
Moths described in 2010